Actiniaria form an order of animals in the class Anthozoa that includes sea anemones.

Taxonomy
Rodriguez et al proposed a new classification for the Actiniaria based on extensive DNA results.

Suborders, Superfamilies and Families included in Actiniaria are: 
 Suborder Anenthemonae
 Superfamily Edwardsioidea
 Family Edwardsiidae
 Superfamily Actinernoidea
 Family Actinernidae
 Family Halcuriidae
 Suborder Enthemonae
 Superfamily Actinostoloidea
 Family Actinostolidae
 Family Halcampulactidae
 Superfamily Actinioidea
 Family Actiniidae
 Family Actinodendridae
 Family Andresiidae
 Family Capneidae
 Family Condylanthidae
 Family Haloclavidae
 Family Homostichanthidae
 Family Iosactinidae
 Family Limnactiniidae
 Family Liponematidae
 Family Minyadidae
 Family Oractinidae
 Family Phymanthidae
 Family Preactiniidae
 Family Ptychodactinidae
 Family Stichodactylidae
 Family Thalassianthidae
 Superfamily Metridioidea
 Family Acontiophoridae
 Family Actinoscyphiidae
 Family Aiptasiidae
 Family Aiptasiomorphidae
 Family Aliciidae
 Family Amphianthidae
 Family Andvakiidae
 Family Antipodactinidae
 Family Bathyphelliidae
 Family Boloceroididae
 Family Diadumenidae
 Family Exocoelactinidae
 Family Gonactiniidae
 Family Halcampidae
 Family Haliactinidae
 Family Haliplanellidae
 Family Hormathiidae
 Family Isanthidae
 Family Kadosactinidae
 Family Metridiidae
 Family Mimetridiidae
 Family Nemanthidae
 Family Nevadneidae
 Family Octineonidae
 Family Ostiactinidae
 Family Phelliidae
 Family Ramireziidae
 Family Sagartiidae
 Family Sagartiomorphidae

The older classification of the Actiniaria according to Calgren is as follows:
Suborder Endocoelantheae
Family Actinernidae
Family Halcuriidae
Suborder Nyantheae
Infraorder Athenaria
Family Andresiidae
Family Andwakiidae
Family Edwardsiidae
Family Galatheanthemidae
Family Halcampidae
Family Halcampoididae
Family Haliactiidae
Family Haloclavidae
Family Ilyanthidae
Family Limnactiniidae
Family Octineonidae
Infraorder Boloceroidaria
Family Boloceroididae
Family Nevadneidae
Infraorder Thenaria
Family Acontiophoridae
Family Actiniidae
Family Actinodendronidae
Family Actinoscyphiidae
Family Actinostolidae
Family Aiptasiidae
Family Aiptasiomorphidae
Family Aliciidae
Family Aurelianidae
Family Bathyphelliidae
Family Condylanthidae
Family Diadumenidae
Family Discosomidae
Family Exocoelactiidae
Family Haliplanellidae
Family Hormathiidae
Family Iosactiidae
Family Isanthidae
Family Isophelliidae
Family Liponematidae
Family Metridiidae
Family Minyadidae
Family Nemanthidae
Family Paractidae
Family Phymanthidae
Family Sagartiidae
Family Sagartiomorphidae
Family Stichodactylidae
Family Thalassianthidae
Suborder Protantheae
Family Gonactiniidae
Suborder Ptychodacteae
Family Preactiidae
Family Ptychodactiidae

References

Actiniaria classification

Actiniaria
Lists of echinoderms